Mohammad Bazmavar (born 1953) is a retired Iranian freestyle wrestler. He was born in Tehran. He won a bronze medal at the 1978 World Wrestling Championships and placed fourth in 1977 and 1982.

References

Living people
1953 births
Iranian male sport wrestlers
World Wrestling Championships medalists
Sportspeople from Tehran
20th-century Iranian people